AHW may refer to:

 Atomic hydrogen welding, an arc welding process that uses an arc between two metal tungsten electrodes in a shielding atmosphere of hydrogen
 Aeromist-Kharkiv, an airline based in Kharkiv, Ukraine
 Ahnapee and Western Railway, a common carrier short line railroad located in northeastern Wisconsin
 Advanced Hypersonic Weapon, a DARPA project
 Akkadisches Handwörterbuch (AHw), a German lexicon of the Akkadian language